The Personnel Office is responsible for managing the Isle of Man's Civil Service. It is an independent government agency, established under the Civil Service Act 1990. The main functions of the Personnel Office include recruitment and selection, training and development, and employee relations.

It is an important government agency responsible for managing the recruitment, training, and development of staff in the Isle of Man Civil Service. It plays a vital role in ensuring that the Civil Service operates effectively and efficiently.

Recruitment and selection
The Personnel Office is responsible for recruiting and selecting staff for the Isle of Man Civil Service. It advertises job vacancies, processes applications, and conducts interviews and assessments to ensure that the best candidates are selected for the job.

Training and development
The Personnel Office provides training and development opportunities for the staff of the Isle of Man Civil Service. This includes training courses, workshops, and other learning opportunities to help staff develop the skills and knowledge they need to do their jobs effectively.

Employee relations
The Personnel Office is responsible for managing employee relations in the Isle of Man Civil Service. This includes handling grievances, disciplinary matters, and other employment issues. The Personnel Office also provides advice and support to managers and staff on employment matters.

The Personnel Office works closely with the Isle of Man Government's Cabinet Office to ensure that the Civil Service is run efficiently and effectively. It is committed to promoting equality and diversity in the workplace and providing a safe and healthy working environment for all staff.

Government of the Isle of Man